The Battle of Tenancingo was a military action of the Mexican War of Independence fought on 22 January 1812 on the outskirts of Tenancingo de Degollado, Mexico. The battle was fought between the royalist forces loyal to the Spanish crown and the Mexican rebels fighting for independence from the Spanish Empire. The Mexican insurgents were commanded by General José María Morelos y Pavón and the Spanish by Rosendo Porlier y Asteguieta. The battle resulted in a victory for the Mexican rebels.

The battle
Rosendo Porlier y Asteguieta initially met with success in this campaign, defeating the forces of Hermenegildo Galeana at the Battle of Tecualoya. His victorious army then marched to Tenancingo de Degollado. Porlier was initially in a position to enter the town and recapture it for the Spanish crown, but he failed to do so. General José María Morelos y Pavón and his forces arrived at the city from the south after receiving pleas for help from Tenango del Valle and from Heroica Zitácuaro and proceeded to give battle. After a bitter fight, Morelos' army proved to be victorious. Initially, Morelos was going to continue his march towards Mexico City, but news had reached him of the insurgent defeat at the Battle of Zitácuaro and the flight of the "Suprema Junta Nacional Gubernativa" from that city. He went on to cancel his advance on Mexico as the rebel forces reorganized themselves following that crushing defeat.

See also 
 Mexican War of Independence

References

Bibliography 

Tecualoya
Tenancingo
History of the State of Mexico
Tecualoya
Tecualoya
1812 in New Spain
January 1812 events